The Federal University of Rondônia (UNIR) is located in the state of Rondônia, in Brazil. It is the only public university in Rondônia.

Campuses
The Federal University of Rondônia has 8 campuses located in:

Ariquemes
Cacoal
Guajará-Mirim
Ji-Paraná
Porto Velho
Presidente Médici
Rolim de Moura
Vilhena

References

External links

 

Rondonia, Federal
Education in Rondônia
Educational institutions established in 1974
1974 establishments in Brazil